SF Line was the name of the Finnish shipping company now known as Viking Line. The company, originally named Rederi Ab Ålandsfärjan, was one of three shipping companies that formed shipping marketing company Viking Line in 1966, the other two being Rederi Ab Vikinglinjen and Rederi AB Slite.  After the other companies left Viking Line in 1988 and 1993 respectively, SF Line stood as the sole owner of Viking Line. As a result, SF Line changed its name to Viking Line in 1995.

History
Rederi Ab Vikinglinjen (later Rederi Ab Solstad and merged into Rederi Ab Sally in 1970) was founded in 1959 and started ferry operations between Gräddö (Sweden) and Korpo (Finland). After a disagreement between the founders, a group of men led by Gunnar Eklund left Rederi Ab Vikinglinjen and started a new company, Rederi Ab Ålandsfärjan. The new company purchased the steamer Brittany, renamed her Ålandsfärjan and started operations between Kapellskär (Sweden) and Mariehamn (Åland) in direct competition with Rederi Ab Vikinglinjen.

In 1966, Rederi Ab Ålandsfärjan, Rederi Ab Vikinglinjen and Rederi AB Slite joined forces and founded the marketing company Viking Line in order to compete with Silja Line. During the following years, the three companies ordered many newbuildings and Viking Line became a dominant operator in baltic ferry operations.

In 1970, Rederi Ab Ålandsfärjan changed its name to SF Line, 'S' referring to Sverige (Sweden) and 'F' to Finland. Their first newbuilding was the MS Kapella, delivered in 1967. As a tribute to Gunnar Eklund's wife Ellen, the names of all subsequent new ships of SF Line ends with '-ella'.

When Rederi Ab Sally in 1987 was acquired by Silja Line's owning company EffJohn, SF Line and Rederi AB Slite forced Sally to leave Viking Line. After the bankruptcy of Rederi AB Slite in 1993, SF Line was the only remaining company in Viking Line. SF Line then changed its name to Viking Line.

Ships
1963 SS Ålandsfärjan (sold for scrap in 1972)
1967 MS Kapella (sold in 1979, scrapped in 2006)
1970 MS Marella (sold in 1980, scrapped in 2004)
1973 MS Aurella (sold in 1982, currently MS C.T.M.A Vacancier for Coopérative de transport maritime et aérien)
1979 MS Turella (sold in 1988, currently MS Kongshavn for Kystlink)
1980 MS Rosella
1985 MS Mariella
1987 MS Ålandsfärjan (sold in 2008 to G.A.P Adventures, renamed Expedition)
1988 MS Amorella
1989 MS Isabella (currently MS Isabelle for Tallink)
1989 MS Cinderella (renamed MS Viking Cinderella in 2003)
1997 MS Gabriella
2008 MS Viking XPRS
2012 MS Viking Grace

See also
Viking Line
Rederi Ab Sally
Rederi AB Slite
Silja Line

External links
Viking Line Finnish homepage
Viking Line Ålandian homepage
Viking Line Swedish homepage
 (in Swedish)

Shipping companies of Finland